Hyderabad Samajik Sudhar Sangh or Hyderabad Social Service League, was a social movement formed in 1915 in Hyderabad (present capital of Telangana State, India). Keshav Rao Koratkar and Vaman Naik were founders of this movement.

Annual social conferences
Hyderabad Social Service League held annual social conferences in various parts of erstwhile Hyderabad state. The passed Social Service League conferences passed resolutions on subjects like necessity of promoting primary education, women's education remarriage of widows, inter caste marriages, and opening of libraries in the State.

References

Social groups of Telangana
Education in Telangana
History of Telangana
Organisations based in Hyderabad, India
Marathwada
Kalaburagi
Nanded
History of Hyderabad, India
1915 establishments in India